Clausidiidae is a family of parasitic copepods in the order Cyclopoida, containing the following genera:

Cemihyclops Karanovic, 2008
Clausidium Kossmann, 1875
Conchyliurus Bocquet & Stock, 1957
Foliomolgus I. M. Kim, 2001
Giardella Canu, 1888
Goodingius I. M. Kim, 2007
Hamaticyclops Kim I.H., 2015
Hemadona I. M. Kim & Ho, 2003
Hemicyclops Boeck, 1872
Hersiliodes Canu, 1888
Hippomolgus G. O. Sars, 1917
Hyphalion Humes, 1987
Leptinogaster Pelseneer, 1929
Pholadicola Ho & Wardle, 1992
Pontoclausia Bacescu & Por, 1959
Pseudopsyllus T. Scott, 1902

References

External links
World of copepods
Tree of Life Web Project

Poecilostomatoida
Crustacean families